The Rose Foundation could mean any of the following:

 The Rose Foundation for Communities and the Environment
 Rose Education Foundation